Sergio Fontanari (19 February 1930 – 4 May 2022) was an Italian politician. A member of the South Tyrolean People's Party, he served in the Senate of the Republic from 1979 to 1987. He died in Trento on 4 May 2022 at the age of 92.

References

1930 births
2022 deaths
Members of the Senate of the Republic (Italy)
South Tyrolean People's Party politicians
People from Trentino